Princeton High School may refer to:

Princeton High School (Illinois), Princeton, Illinois
Princeton Community High School, Princeton, Indiana
Princeton High School (Minnesota), Princeton, Minnesota
Princeton Junior-Senior High School, Princeton, Missouri
Princeton High School (North Carolina), Princeton, North Carolina
Princeton High School (New Jersey), Princeton, New Jersey
Princeton High School (Sharonville, Ohio)
Princeton High School (Texas), Princeton, Texas
Princeton High School (West Virginia), Princeton, West Virginia
Princeton High School (Wisconsin), Princeton, Wisconsin